Hypergraphia is a behavioral condition characterized by the intense desire to write or draw. Forms of hypergraphia can vary in writing style and content.  It is a symptom associated with temporal lobe changes in epilepsy and in Geschwind syndrome. Structures that may have an effect on hypergraphia when damaged due to temporal lobe epilepsy are the hippocampus and Wernicke's area.  Aside from temporal lobe epilepsy, chemical causes may be responsible for inducing hypergraphia.

Characteristics

Writing style
American neurologists Stephen Waxman and Norman Geschwind were the first to describe hypergraphia, in the 1970s.  The patients they observed displayed highly compulsive detailed writing, sometimes with literary creativity.  The patients kept diaries, which some used to meticulously document minute details of their everyday activities, write poetry, or create lists.  Case 1 of their study wrote lists of her relatives, her likes and dislikes, and the furniture in her apartment.  Beside lists, the patient wrote poetry, often with a moral or philosophical undertone.  She described an incident in which she wrote the lyrics of a song she learned when she was 17 several hundred times and another incident in which she felt the urge to write a word over and over again.  Another patient wrote aphorisms and certain sentences in repetition.

A patient from a separate study experienced "continuously rhyming in his head" for five years after a seizure and said that he "felt the need to write them down." The patient did not talk in rhyme, nor did he read poetry.  Language capacity and mental status were normal for this patient, except for recorded right-temporal spikes on electroencephalograms.  This patient had right-hemisphere epilepsy.  Functional MRI scans of other studies suggest that rhyming behavior is produced in the left hemisphere, but Mendez proposed that hyperactive electrical activity of the right hemisphere may induce a release of writing and rhyming abilities in the left hemisphere.

Content

In addition to writing in different forms (poetry, books, repetition of one word), hypergraphia patients differ in the complexity of their writings.  While some writers (e.g. Alice Flaherty and Dyane Harwood) use their hypergraphia to help them write extensive papers and books, most patients do not write things of substance.  Flaherty defines hypergraphia, as a result of temporal lobe epilepsy, as a condition that "increase[s] idea generation, sometimes at the expense of quality." Patients hospitalized with temporal lobe epilepsy and other disorders causing hypergraphia have written memos and lists (like their favorite songs) and recorded their dreams in extreme length and detail. 

There are many accounts of patients writing in nonsensical patterns including writing in a center-seeking spiral starting around the edges of a piece of paper. In one case study, a patient even wrote backward, so that the writing could only be interpreted with the aid of a mirror. Sometimes the writing can consist of scribbles and frantic, random thoughts that are quickly jotted down on paper very frequently.  Grammar can be present, but the meaning of these thoughts is generally hard to grasp and the sentences are loose. In some cases, patients write extremely detailed accounts of events that are occurring or descriptions of where they are.

In some cases, hypergraphia can manifest with compulsive drawing. Drawings by patients with hypergraphia exhibit repetition and a high level of detail, sometimes mixing both compulsive writing and drawing together.

Causes
Some studies have suggested that hypergraphia is related to bipolar disorder, hypomania, and schizophrenia. Although creative ability was observed in the patients of these studies, signs of creativity were observed, not hypergraphia specifically.  Therefore, it is difficult to say with absolute certainty that hypergraphia is a symptom of these psychiatric illnesses because creativity in patients with bipolar disorder, hypomania, or schizophrenia may manifest into something aside from writing.  However, other studies have shown significant accounts between hypergraphia and temporal lobe epilepsy and chemical causes.

Temporal lobe epilepsy 

Hypergraphia is a symptom of temporal lobe epilepsy, a condition of reoccurring seizures caused by excessive neuronal activity, but it is not a common symptom among patients.  Less than 10 percent of patients with temporal lobe epilepsy exhibit characteristics of hypergraphia.  Temporal lobe epilepsy patients may exhibit irritability, discomfort, or an increasing feeling of dread if their writing activity is disrupted. To elicit such responses when interrupting their writing suggests that hypergraphia is a compulsive condition, resulting in an obsessive motivation to write. A temporal lobe epilepsy may influence frontotemporal connections in such a way that the drive to write is increased in the frontal lobe, beginning with the prefrontal and premotor cortex planning out what to write, and then leading to the motor cortex (located next to the central fissure) executing the physical movement of writing.

Most temporal lobe epilepsy patients who suffer from hypergraphia can write words, but not all may have the capacity to write complete sentences that have meaning.

Chemical 
Certain drugs have been known to induce hypergraphia including donepezil.  In one case study, a patient taking donepezil reported an elevation in mood and energy levels which led to hypergraphia and other excessive forms of speech (such as singing). Six other cases of patients taking donepezil and experiencing mania have been previously reported.  These patients also had cases of dementia, cognitive impairment from a cerebral aneurysm, bipolar I disorder, and/or depression.  Researchers are unsure why donepezil can induce mania and hypergraphia.  It could potentially result from an increase in acetylcholine levels, which would have an effect on the other neurotransmitters in the brain.

Another potential cause of hypergraphia is one of the body's neurotransmitters, dopamine (DA).  Dopamine has been known to decrease latent inhibition, which causes a decrease in the ability to habituate to different stimuli.  Low latent inhibition leads to an excessive level of stimulation and could contribute to the onset of hypergraphia and general creativity.  This research implies that there is a direct correlation between the levels of DA between neuronal synapses and the level of creativity exhibited by the patient.  DA agonists increase the levels of DA between synapses which results in higher levels of creativity, and the opposite is true for DA antagonists.

Pathophysiology

Several regions of the brain are involved in the act of writing.  Primary areas are the superior parietal cortex and the frontal lobe, the region of the brain that plans out movement. An area of the frontal lobe that is especially active is Exner's area, located in the premotor cortex. The physical motion of the hand is controlled by the primary motor cortex, also located in the frontal lobe, and the right cerebellum. Writing creatively and generating ideas, on the other hand, is controlled by the limbic system, specifically involving the activity of the hippocampus, which is important in the retrieval of long-term memories. Words and ideas are cognized and understood by the temporal lobes, and these temporal lobes are connected to the limbic system. 

Although hypergraphia cannot be isolated to one specific part of the brain, some areas are known to have more of an effect than others.  The hippocampus has been found to play a role in the occurrence of temporal lobe epilepsy and schizophrenia.  In one study, rats induced with temporal lobe epilepsy showed an increase in dopamine neural activity in the hippocampus.  Because hypergraphia has been linked to temporal lobe epilepsy and schizophrenia, the hippocampus could have an effect on hypergraphia as well. In another study, patients with bilateral hippocampal atrophy (BHA) showed signs of having Geschwind syndrome, including hypergraphia.

While epilepsy-induced hypergraphia is usually lateralized to the left cerebral hemisphere in the language areas, hypergraphia associated with lesions and other brain damage usually occurs in the right cerebral hemisphere. Lesions to the right side of the brain usually cause hypergraphia because they can disinhibit language function on the left side of the brain. Hypergraphia has also been known to be caused by right hemisphere strokes and tumors.

Lesions to Wernicke's area (in the left temporal lobe) can increase speech output, which can sometimes manifest itself in writing.

Society and culture

Hypergraphia was one of the central issues in the 1999 trial of Alvin Ridley for the imprisonment and murder of his wife Virginia Ridley. The mysterious woman, who had died in bed of apparent suffocation, had remained secluded in her home for 27 years in the small town of Ringgold, Georgia, United States.  Her 10,000-page journal, which provided abundant evidence that she suffered from epilepsy and had remained housebound of her own will, was instrumental in the acquittal of her husband.

In 1969, Isaac Asimov said "I am a compulsive writer". Other artistic figures reported to have been affected by hypergraphia include Vincent van Gogh, Fyodor Dostoevsky, and Robert Burns. Alice in Wonderland author Lewis Carroll is also said to have had the condition, having written more than 98,000 letters in various formats throughout his life. Some were written backward, in rebus, and in patterns, as with "The Mouse's Tale" in Alice.

See also
 Automatic writing
 Free writing
 Graphomania

References

Further reading
 
 Pickover, C. A. (1999). Strange brains and genius: The secret lives of eccentric scientists and madmen. New York: William Morrow. 
 Schachter, S. C., Holmes, G. L., & Kasteleijn-Nolst Trenité, D. (2008). Behavioral aspects of epilepsy: Principles and practice. New York: Demos. 

Impulse-control disorders
Writing